Sarik-Gajah are two pyroclastic cones right at the equator line on Sumatra island, Indonesia. The first cone is Sarik, an andesitic/basaltic vegetated cone. The other is andesic-dacitic Gajah cone, 10 km south-west of the first one and it contains lava flow. No was eruptive history ever recorded from this volcanic complex.

See also 

 List of volcanoes in Indonesia

References 

Volcanoes of Sumatra
Stratovolcanoes of Indonesia
Mountains of Sumatra
Pyroclastic cones